Michael Starke (born 13 November 1957) is a British actor and singer from Liverpool, England, best known for his role as Thomas 'Sinbad' Sweeney, which he played for sixteen years, in the Channel 4 soap opera Brookside (initially credited as Mickey Starke). 

After his departure from Brookside, in October 2000, he appeared in a Christmas 2000 episode of the BBC drama Casualty. In the episode, "A Turn of the Scrooge", broadcast on 16 December 2000, he played the part of Barry Dawson, a loner who is befriended by a widower neighbour (played by Kenneth Colley), following a rooftop accident with Christmas decorations.

Starke later appeared in the ITV drama The Royal as Kenneth Hopkirk, as policeman Arthur in the film The 51st State and as himself on Lily Savage's Blankety Blank. He is a patron of Zöe's Place Baby Hospice, a charity for sick babies and young children.

He appeared in the pantomime Cinderella in Southport over Christmas 2005, alongside Stuart Wade from Emmerdale, and in Aladdin during Christmas 2006, along with comedian Syd Little, in York. He also appeared in the play No Holds Bard, alongside Andrew Schofield.

In March 2007, he joined the cast of Coronation Street as the patriarch of a new family, the Mortons, playing Jerry Morton, a single father who opens a kebab shop. He, along with the rest of the Morton family, left the show in September 2008 due to a new producer wanting the show to go in a new direction.

His daughter, Hayley Hampson, appeared on the ITV show Grease Is the Word and made it onto the live shows; she finished in sixth place. His other daughter, Jamie, is an actress and appeared in an episode of The Royal.

In recent years he has starred in many touring productions of West End musicals, including playing the role of Edna Turnblad in the first UK tour of Hairspray and originating the role of Monsignor Howard in the first UK tour of Sister Act the musical.  He also made appearances in Anything Goes and Our Day Out.

Starke appeared in the 2014 Kenneth Branagh directed action thriller film "Jack Ryan: Shadow Recruit". Later he starred in the soap opera Doctors.

In December 2017, he appeared at the Liverpool Playhouse in the new musical "The Star".

In 2018, Starke appeared in Benidorm and in the TV drama "Virtues". He also appeared in the Christmas 2018 episode of Casualty in the guest role of Joe Blake.

He is a regular cabaret performer on P&O Britannia and is working on a new musical with his songwriting partner, Joe Wynne, about Everton FC.

In 2021, Starke appeared in the Channel 4 soap opera Hollyoaks.

References

External links

1957 births
Living people
English male soap opera actors
Male actors from Liverpool